The Peekskill meteorite is among the most historic meteorite events on record. Sixteen separate video recordings document the meteorite burning through the Earth's atmosphere in October 1992, whereupon it struck a parked car in Peekskill, New York, United States. The Peekskill meteorite is an H6 monomict breccia; its filigreed texture is the result of the shocking and heating following the impact of two asteroids in outer space. The meteorite is of the stony variety and approximately 20% of its mass is tiny flakes of nickel-iron. The Peekskill meteorite is estimated to be 4.4 billion years old.

Descent
The meteorite fell on October 9, 1992 – an event witnessed by thousands across the East Coast. Numerous residents of Pittsburgh, Philadelphia and Washington D.C. described the "huge greenish fireball." The meteorite broke up over Kentucky and passed over West Virginia and Pennsylvania on its north-northeast trajectory before striking a parked 1980 red Chevy Malibu at approximately 7:50 pm EDT.

Video
As the meteorite fell on a Friday evening, its descent was captured on video by many high school football fans taping local games. The descent was captured by 16 different cameras. Only a handful of meteorite falls have been caught on film—and only the 2013 Russian meteor event has been captured from more angles and localities. The multiple perspectives provided scientists with the ability to calculate the meteorite's flight path to Earth.

Impact
The Peekskill meteorite smashed through the trunk of a red 1980 Chevrolet Malibu and narrowly missed the gas tank, finally coming to rest in an impact pit beneath the car. Seventeen-year-old Michelle Knapp, the car's owner, heard the collision from inside her home. She later described the sound as “like a three-car crash”. Hurrying outside to investigate the noise, Knapp found her car smashed and the meteorite weighing , still warm and smelling of sulfur, beneath it.

Specimens
Knapp retrieved the meteorite, after which it was sold to a consortium of three dealers for $50,000. Today, small specimens of the Peekskill  meteorite sell for approximately $125 per gram.

Knapp had just purchased the car for $300. Immediately following the extraterrestrial impact, the vehicle was sold to Iris Lang, wife of renowned meteorite collector and dealer Al Lang, for $25,000.  Since then, it has been on display in numerous museums throughout the world, including New York City's American Museum of Natural History and France's National Museum of Natural History.

The car, as well as the main mass of the meteorite (which currently weighs 890 grams), are now in the Macovich Collection of Meteorites. Additional specimens of the meteorite can be found in Chicago's Field Museum, the American National History Museum, and the Smithsonian.

See also
 Glossary of meteoritics
 Tunguska event
 Chelyabinsk meteor
 Potentially hazardous asteroid
 Near Earth object
 Impact event

References

External links
Peekskill Meteorite Car Official Website
More about the meteorite

The Macovich Collection of Meteorites
One of Discovery's Top 10 Meteorites

All in French.
 All 16 Videos of the Peekskill Meteorite's sightings
 Five photos of the Peekskill Meteorite's sightings
 Detailed Description

Achondrite meteorites
1992 in the United States
1992 in science
Peekskill, New York
Meteorite falls
Meteorites found in the United States
1992 in New York (state)
Asteroidal achondrites
Geology of New York (state)
Meteorites in culture
Individual cars